St. Francois County Jail and Sheriff's Residence is a historic jail and sheriff's residence located in Farmington, St. Francois County, Missouri. It was built in 1870–1871, and is a two-story, three bay, Greek Revival-style brick and limestone building. It has a front gable roof and centered arched front doorway. The building was enlarged slightly around 1909. By 1996, it was one of the oldest operating jails in Missouri, but it was retired in September of that year when the jail moved to a newer and larger facility. The building now serves as a low-cost inn for people traveling along the TransAmerica Bicycle Trail.

It was added to the National Register of Historic Places in 1996. It is located in the Courthouse Square Historic District.

References

Individually listed contributing properties to historic districts on the National Register in Missouri
Jails on the National Register of Historic Places in Missouri
Greek Revival architecture in Missouri
Government buildings completed in 1871
Buildings and structures in St. Francois County, Missouri
National Register of Historic Places in St. Francois County, Missouri